was a Japanese author, known as the creator of the Kogarashi Monjirō novels, which became a hit televised drama series.

Aside from mysteries, he also wrote thrillers, essays and history books, with some 380 books to his credit.

Life and works 
Saho Sasazwa was born , the third son of poet . Born in Yokohama according to many sources, but it has also been said he was actually born in Yodobashi, Tokyo and later moved to Yokohama. There he attended what is now Kanto Gakuin University's high school division, but failed to graduate, frequently running away from home during this period.

By 1952 he was in Tokyo, working at the  Bureau run by the Postal Ministry. Around this time he dabbled in writing plays.

In 1958, he was struck by a DUI car, suffering injuries expecting to take 8 months to fully heal.

In 1960, his  became a runner-up for the 5th Edogawa Rampo Prize, and the release of this in book format marked his debut as novelist.

He adopted the pen name Saho, which was taken from his wife's name .

His  was awarded the 14th Mystery Writers of Japan Award, after which he resigned from the Postal Ministry and became a full-time professional writer.

With his  (1962) he received his third nomination for the prestigious semi-annual Naoki Prize for popular fiction. Around this time, while declaring himself to be one of the practitioners of honkaku-ha (本格派) or "orthodox school" of mystery fiction-writing,{{Refn|group="lower-alpha"|Kenkyusha's Shin wa-ei chū-jiten dictionary (4th ed., 1995) has a subentry on honkaku-ha" and gives the translation "orthodox school". On honkaku-teki it gives three senses: "genuine, real", "orthodox", or "standard".
Amanda C. Seaman says: "..what Japanese critics call , or standard, detective fiction.}} he wrote a trilogy on double-suicide without homicide; of these, the Naoki Prize-nominated Roppongi Double-Suicide was appraised as a piece "depicting empty love between a young man and a girl", which entwined "the drama of loss of faith in humanity" into the mystery novel.

Sasazawa's style of this gambler fiction has been characterized as "casting a nihilistic shadow, an added an aura of Cowboy Westerns". The samurai period gambler piece that brought Sasazawa lasting fame was his Kogarashi Monjirō series, begun with the episode entitled . The book was TV-dramatized with Atsuo Nakamura playing the leading role of the gambler Monjirō, and the program achieved immense popularity.

He continued to write fiction in both contemporary and period settings.

Some of his outputs in modern settings from the subsequent period include the child-kidnapping novel , called a masterpiece on par with his earlier great works;  which launched the Detective Isenami series; was a time-limit kidnapping story with a twist, the scandal-monger must devise a ransom for the perpetrator who only wants vengeance;  features a well-crafted locked room gimmickry.

He also became well known at one time for Akuma no heya ("Devil's room", 1981) and its sequels in his Akuma ("Devil") series of erotic suspense-thriller novels (this being a hybrid genre between the erotic novel and suspense-thriller.

His  started the Hideo Yoake casefile series of novels, dramatized on TV as the  starring Tsunehiko Watase; The TV series  "Interrogation room" ran its first episode in 1994 based on the novel of the same title published 1993.

During his lifetime he published some 377 books.

In 2001 he returned to Kodaira, Tokyo, and succumbed to liver cancer (HCC) on 21 October 2002 at a hospital in Komae, Tokyo.

 Legacy and influence 
He was a prolific writer, who at his height wrote 1,000 or even 1,500 pages of manuscript per month, apud BLOGOS, review, 2015-03-10.、he has been called a "constant innovator"  or experimenter. In particular, Sasazawa is known for applying the mystery novel techniques of "surprise-twist endings (donden-gaeshi)" and climatic endings in writing matatabi fiction, thus introducing a fresh angle in the fiction about these wandering rogue swordsman-gamblers.

Tokuma Bunko formatŌtone no yami ni kieta, 1988-06Kettō Hakone-yama Sanmai-bashi, 1988-07

 The Banished One Kuki Shinjūrō series
, 1979
Tokuma Bunko versionEdo no yūgiri ni kiyu, 1989-05Bijo ka kitsune ka tōge michi, 1989-06

Mushukunin Mikogami no Jokichi Mushukunin Mikogami no Jōkichi jō, Volume 1, Kodansha, 1972Mushukunin Mikogami no Jōkichi chū, Volume 2, 1972Mushukunin Mikogami no Jōkichi ge-no-ichi, Volume 3. Part 1, 1973Mushukunin Mikogami no Jōkichi ge-no-ni, Volume 3. Part 2, 1973
Tokuma Bunko format
"Volume 1", Tokuma Bunko, 1987-10
"Volume 2", 1987-11
"Volume 3", 1987-12
"Volume 4", 1988-01

Otonashi Gen's Casebook
, Kobunsha
Fujimi Shobo
, Jidai Shosetsu Bunko, 1987-12
 , 1988-02
 , 1988-03
, 1988-04
 , 1988-05
 Shodensha format
, Non Pochette Bunko, 1996-12
, 1997-07
, 1997-12Ukiyoe no onna, 1998-06

Himeshiro Nagaretabi series
, Kofudo Shuppan, 1980-10
, 1980-11
, 1981-01
, 1981-01
, 1982-07
Himeshiro's Medicinal Art Travels
, Tokuma Bunko, 1990-03
, 1990-04
, 1990-05
, 1990-06
, 1990-07

Haiku-Poet Issa's Casebook
, Kobunsha, 1989-0
, Kadokawa Shoten, 1991-10
Kadokawa Bunko format
, 1993-01
, 1993-11
Kobunsha Bunko format
, Kobunsha Bunko, 1995-05
, 1996-01
Keibunsha Bunko format
 Bunko, 2001–03
Kosaido Bunko format
 Bunko, 2004–05

Genpaku and Utamaro's Casebook
, Kobunsha Bunko, 1993-02
, 1995-09

Otasuke Doshin series
Otasuke Doshin or the "Helpful Doshin-Detective"
, Sankei Shimbun Seikatsu Joho Center, 1992-10
Non Pochette Bunko format
, Non Pochette (Shobunsha imprint), 1995-10
, 1996-02

Misc.
, Bungeishunjū, 1971
, Shogakukan, 1977
Bunshun Bunko format 1982-01
, Bungeishunjū,  1972
Bunshun Bunko format 1982-04
, Kodansha,  1972
KobunshaBunko format 1988-08
, Bungeishunjū, 1976
Bunshun Bunko format 1987-11/Tokuma Bunko format 2002-07
, Shinchosha, 1976
ShinchoBunko format 1984-01
, Shinchosha, 1979-01
ShinchoBunko format 1984-09
 
, Shincho Bunko, 1988–12. Retitled from Ōedo burai.
, Sankei Shuppan, 1982-04
, Non Pochette Bunko, 1988–11.
, Shueisha, 1984-02
, Yomiuri Shimbunsha, 1986
, Shinchosha, 1988-11
Shincho Bunko format, 1991-09; Futabasha, 1997-05; Tokuma Bunko format, 2002-01
, Non Pochette Bunko, 1988-03
, Non Pochette Bunko, 1988-05
, Kadokawa Bunko, 1988-09
, Non Pochette Bunko, 1989-04
, Shincho Bunko
, Kobunsha, 1990-10
, Kobunsha Bunko, 1999-02
, Kadokawa Bunko, 1990-10
, Kobunsha Bunko, 1992-10
, Bungeishunjū, 1993-03
Bunshun Bunko format, 1996-03; Kobunsha Bunko format, 2000–05
, Futabasha,  1994-12
Futaba novels edition 1997-05
, Kobunsha Bunko, 1995-01
, Futabasha,, 1997-10
Futaba novels edition  1997-05
Futaba Bunko format 2000-06
, Kobunsha, 2000–04
Bunshun Bunko format, 1996-03; Kobunsha Bunko format, 2005-01
, Shodensha Bunko, 2001-01
, Shodensha Bunko, 2002–12
, Kobunsha, 2003–10
Kobunsha Bunko format, 2006-03

Autobiography
, 1978

Essays
, Shodensha, 1978
, Inner Trip, 1981
; Part2; Part3. PHP, 1990; 1991; 1993
, Kadokawa, 1990
, Kayryusha, 1994

 Moving images adaptions 
Films
, Toei, starring Bunta Sugawara.
, Toei, starring Bunta Sugawara.
, Toho, starring Atsuo Nakamura.
, Toho, starring Yoshio Harada.
, Toho, starring Yoshio Harada.
, Toho, starring Yoshio Harada.
, Nikkatsu, starring .

TV Dramas
TV series
, Fuji TV.
, Fuji TV.
, Tokyo 12 Channel Television.
. Toge/Mountain Pass series. Adapted from chapters in Mikaeri tōge no rakujitsu (1970).
, NET.
, Fuji TV.
, Fuji TV.
, TV Tokyo.
, TV Tokyo.

One-off /Single episode
, Fuji TV.
, Fuji TV.

, NTV.
, TV Asahi, starring Tsunehiko Watase.
, TV Asahi.
.
, Fuji TV starring, Yosuke Eguchi.
, TBS.

 Manga adaptations 
, artwork by Goseki Kojima, Geibunsha, 1973.
From the Itako no Itaro'' series.

Explanatory notes

References  
Citations

Bibliography

External links 
 Saho Sasazawa Official Homepage
 Kogarashi Monjirō Memorial Museum
 Saho Sasazawa via  (brief biographical video on NHK TV)

1930 births
2002 deaths

Japanese mystery writers
20th-century Japanese novelists
Mystery Writers of Japan Award winners
People from Tokyo Metropolis
People from Yokohama
Kanto Gakuin University alumni